Kasper Lunding Jakobsen (born 17 July 1999) is a Danish footballer who plays as a winger for Norwegian club Aalesund.

Club career
On 21 December 2022, Lunding Jakobsen signed a contract with Aalesund in Norway until the summer of 2026.

Career statistics

References

External links
 Career stats & Profile - Voetbal International

1999 births
Footballers from Aarhus
Living people
Danish men's footballers
Danish expatriate men's footballers
Denmark youth international footballers
Association football wingers
Aarhus Gymnastikforening players
Odds BK players
Heracles Almelo players
Aalesunds FK players
Danish Superliga players
Eliteserien players
Eredivisie players
Eerste Divisie players
Danish expatriate sportspeople in Norway
Expatriate footballers in Norway
Danish expatriate sportspeople in the Netherlands
Expatriate footballers in the Netherlands